Dallas Theological Seminary (DTS) is an evangelical theological seminary in Dallas, Texas. It is known for popularizing the theological system dispensationalism. DTS has campuses in Dallas, Houston, and Washington, D.C., as well as extension campuses in Atlanta, Austin, San Antonio, Nashville, Northwest Arkansas, Europe, Guatemala, and Australasia and a multilingual online education program.

History
DTS was founded as Evangelical Theological College in 1924 by Rollin T. Chafer and his brother, Lewis Sperry Chafer, who taught the first class of thirteen students, and William Henry Griffith Thomas, who was to have been the school's first theology professor but died before the first classes began. Their vision was a school where expository Bible preaching was taught simply, and under Chafers' leadership, DTS pioneered one of the first four-year degrees in theology, the Master of Theology (Th.M.). The present location of the school was purchased in 1926 and Doctor of Theology (Th.D.) program was started in 1927. Chafer remained president until his death in 1952.

DTS has continually published a quarterly entitled Bibliotheca Sacra initially edited by Rollin T. Chafer, since 1934. In 1983, a complete collection of "Bib Sac" articles was published as a book commemorating fifty years 
of the journal.

John F. Walvoord took over as president in 1952 after Chafer's death in 1952. In 1974, DTS added a two-year Master of Arts (MA) program in biblical studies, and in 1982, a two-year program in Christian Education was begun. In addition to these, a Doctor of Ministry (D.Min.) program was opened in 1980. Walvoord retired as DTS president in 1986.

From 1986 to 1994, Donald K. Campbell served as president of DTS. During his tenure, DTS opened a three-year MA program in Biblical Counseling and a two-year MA program in Biblical exegesis and linguistics.

Chuck Swindoll served as president of the seminary from 1994 to 2001. Mark Bailey followed, serving as president from 2001 to 2020. Under Bailey's tenure, the seminary added a two-year MA program in media and communication, a two-year MA in Christian leadership, a Spanish D.Min. program, and a multi-lingual online education program. He was succeeded by Mark Yarbrough in 2020.

As of Spring 2014, DTS had over 15,000 alumni serving in various ministerial capacities in 97 countries worldwide.

Accreditation
DTS was first accredited in 1944 by the Board of Regents, State Education Department of the University of the State of New York of Albany. After that institution stopped accrediting institutions outside of New York, DTS was accredited in 1969 by the Southern Association of Colleges and Schools and in 1994 by the Association of Theological Schools in the United States and Canada.

The school is also a member of the Association of Christian Schools International (ACSI), the Evangelical Training Association (ETA), the Jerusalem University College, and the Institute of Theological Studies (ITS).

Theology

DTS is known as a center of modern dispensational teaching due to Dr. Chafer's development of a systematic theology which approaches the Bible with a "premillennial, dispensational interpretation of the Scriptures." Systematic Theology, his eight-volume work describing this approach, was first published in 1948 and is still a required textbook for some courses at DTS.

Notable theological beliefs of the school include: premillennialism, dispensationalism, and Biblical inerrancy. The school considers itself non-denominational within Protestantism, and offers classes in all 66 books of the Protestant Bible.

Notable people 
In a 2009 study conducted by LifeWay Research, Protestant pastors named preachers who had most influenced them. Three DTS alumni were among the top ten: Chuck Swindoll ('63), founder of radio broadcast Insight for Living; David Jeremiah ('67), founder of Turning Point Radio and Television Ministries; and Andy Stanley ('85), founder of North Point Ministries. Other notable people associated with the seminary include:

Alumni 
Gregory Beale, former president of the Evangelical Theological Society
Steve Breedlove, bishop of the Anglican Church in North America
Michael J. Easley, former president of Moody Bible Institute
Tony Evans, pastor and widely syndicated radio broadcaster
F. David Farnell, professor of New Testament at The Master's Seminary
Arnold Fruchtenbaum, Messianic Jewish scholar and founder of Ariel Ministries
Chip Ingram, pastor and orator, founder of Living on the Edge
Robert Jeffress, pastor of First Baptist Church in Dallas, Texas
David Jeremiah, author, pastor of Shadow Mountain Community Church
Howard Clark Kee, American Bible scholar
Mark Keough, Republican member of the Texas House of Representatives
Lawrence Khong, senior pastor of Faith Community Baptist Church
David Klingler, former NFL player and current professor of Bible Exposition
Peter Lillback, president and professor of historical theology and church history at Westminster Theological Seminary
Hal Lindsey, author of The Late, Great Planet Earth
Duane Litfin, former president of Wheaton College
J. Vernon McGee, founder of "Thru the Bible Radio Network" program
 Paul Mills, current head men's basketball coach at Oral Roberts University
Mark Nordstrom, bishop of the Anglican Church in North America
Paul Nyquist, former president of Moody Bible Institute
Scott O'Grady, pilot whose story formed the basis for the film Behind Enemy Lines
Ernest Pickering, former president of Central Baptist Theological Seminary of Minneapolis
Jim Rayburn, founder of Young Life
Ron Rhodes, author of over 80 books, and president of Reasoning from the Scriptures Ministries
Haddon Robinson, former President at Gordon-Conwell Theological Seminary
Priscilla Shirer, author, motivational speaker, and actress
Andy Stanley, author, and pastor of North Point Community Church
Ray Stedman, evangelical Christian pastor, and author. 
Joseph Stowell, former president of Moody Bible Institute, current president of Cornerstone University
Chuck Swindoll, author, pastor of Stonebriar Community Church
Kenneth N. Taylor, creator of The Living Bible and the founder of Tyndale House
Robert Thieme, author, pastor of Berachah Church, Houston, TX
John Townsend, co-author of Boundaries: When to Say Yes, How to Say No to Take Control of Your Life
Bruce Wilkinson, founder of Walk Thru the Bible and author of The Prayer of Jabez

Current and former faculty 
Craig A. Blaising, Professor of Systematic Theology, proponent of progressive dispensationalism
Darrell L. Bock, Senior Research Professor of New Testament
Buist M. Fanning, Professor of New Testament studies
John D. Hannah, Scholar of Reformation Theology
Everett F. Harrison, Professor of New Testament (deceased)
Howard Hendricks, Professor of Christian Education (deceased)
Zane C. Hodges Scholar of Free Grace Theology (deceased)
Harold Hoehner, Distinguished Professor of New Testament Studies, (deceased) 
Harry A. Ironside, visiting lecturer from 1925-'43 (deceased)
David Klingler, Associate Professor of Bible Exposition
Eugene Merrill, Distinguished Professor of Old Testament Studies (Emeritus)
J. Dwight Pentecost, Distinguished Professor of Bible Exposition (deceased)
Charles Caldwell Ryrie Professor of Systematic Theology (deceased)
Merrill Unger, Professor of Old Testament Studies (deceased)
Daniel B. Wallace, Professor of New Testament Studies (prolific textual critic and Greek grammarian)
Bruce Waltke, Professor of Old Testament Studies
John Walvoord President, Professor of Systematic Theology (deceased)

References

External links
Official website

 
Evangelicalism in Texas
Evangelical seminaries and theological colleges in the United States
Universities and colleges accredited by the Southern Association of Colleges and Schools
Seminaries and theological colleges in Texas
Universities and colleges in Dallas
Educational institutions established in 1924
Premillennialism
1924 establishments in Texas